Mangshi Town is an urban town  in Mangshi, Yunnan, China. It borders Xiangda Township and Longshan Town in the north and east, and FengpingTown and Xuangang Township in the west and south.

Administrative division
As of December 2015, the town is divided into 10 villages: 
 Dawan
 Songshuzhai
 Manghe
 Lahuai
 Huixian
 Zhongdong
 Xiadong
 Xiangguntang
 Hexinchang
 Yunmao

History
Mangshi was incorporated as a town in 1954, after the establishment of the Communist State.

In 1969, it was renamed "Dongfanghong Commune".

In 1984 it reverted to its former name of "Mangshi Town".

In 2005, Chengjiao Town and Guntang Township were incorporated into the town.

In 2007, Menghuan Subdistrict separated from Mangshi Town.

Geography
Mangshi Town located in northern Mangshi city. 

The Nannai River, Manggang River, Huyang River, Shaozhi River and Banguo River flow through the town.

Climate
Summer is not hot, winter is not cold.

Economy
Jewelry is the main source of local economy.

Mangshi Economic Development Zone is located in the town.

Education
 Mangshi Central Primary School
 Mangshi No. 1 School
 Mangshi Suburban Middle School
 Mangshi Minzu High School

Attractions
Menglongsha Park is a public urban park in the town.

Zhe'anyin Temple, Wuyun Temple and Puti Temple (菩提寺) are Buddhist temples in the town.

Mengbana Garden is an AAAA-level scenic spot in the town.

Transportation
The National Highway G320 passes across the town.

References

Divisions of Mangshi